John William Heard (July 3, 1938 – December 10, 2021) was an American bass player and artist. His recording credits include albums with Pharoah Sanders, George Duke, Oscar Peterson, Count Basie, Zoot Sims, Ahmad Jamal, Frank Morgan, George Cables. His professional jazz performance career lasted from the 1960s to the early 2010s, during which he also worked as a visual artist, producing drawings, paintings, and sculptures.

Background
He was born in Pittsburgh, Pennsylvania, United States.

He also played saxophone in his early years. He began playing bass at the age of 14. His professional career began in a band that included sax player Booker Ervin, drummer J.C. Moses, pianist Horace Parlan and trumpet player Tommy Turrentine. While in high school, he attended special classes at the Carnegie Museum of Art.

In 1958, he joined the United States Air Force and was sent to Germany. Because of his art experience he was given a job of designing posters for events. He also did some art teaching, teaching the wives of officers. He left the Air Force in 1961 and enrolled at the Art Institute of Pittsburgh. He returned to music and went to Buffalo and later to California.

On December 10, 2021, Heard died at the age of 83.

Art
In the 1980s, he had converted a North Hollywood garage into a studio and was spending much time there painting. He said that he was hanging out with Santa Monica-based sculptor Jim Casey, who was teaching him the way he wanted to learn. 18 months prior to his being interviewed for the article he had taken up sculpting. His first one was a bust of Duke Ellington, then one of Billy Eckstine. At the time he was working on one of Louis Armstrong.

Examples of his work are held in the Oakland Museum of California. They include drawings of Bud Powell and Milt Jackson.

Musical career

1960s
Playing double-bass, he has worked with Tommy Turrentine and Al Jarreau from the mid to late 1960s. Also in the late 1960s he worked with Jean-Luc Ponty, Sonny Rollins and Wes Montgomery.

1970s
In the 1970s, he performed with Toshiko Akiyoshi, Count Basie, Louie Bellson, John Collins, Joe Henderson, Ahmad Jamal, Blue Mitchell and Oscar Peterson.

1980s
In the 1980s, he performed with Eddie "Lockjaw" Davis, Buddy Montgomery and Pharoah Sanders.

In 1981, he played bass on the Blue Balkan album by pianist Larry Vuckovich. Other musicians to play on the album were vibraphonist Bobby Hutcherson and drummer Eddie More. Heard also played with Vuckovich's band on their first "Club Date" show on PBS, which was picked up by at least 120 cities in the U.S. In addition to Heard and Vuckovitch, the band included Tom Harrell on trumpet, and Sherman Ferguson on drums. As an unexpected bonus, the group was joined by saxophonist Charles McPherson for their last piece. The show's producer Paul Marshall spotted him in the audience, and asked him if he had his saxophone which he did and asked him to join them.

In 1983, he joined Tom Ranier and Sherman Ferguson to create the group Heard, Ranier, Ferguson, which released an eponymous album on the ITI Records label in 1983. The album art included a lithograph of Count Basie that was drawn by John Heard. An article in Billboard'''s October 1983 issue, indicated that he was going to be used as a graphic artist for the label. He was to be marketed as both an artist and a musician.

In an article in the Los Angeles Times dated 31 May 1987, he said that he had always wanted to paint, and planned to leave music. Before his retirement he had managed to record with musicians such as Spanish pianist Tete Montoliu, Eddie "Lockjaw" Davis, Art Pepper, Clark Terry, Pharoah Sanders, Zoot Sims and Joe Williams.

1990s
After taking time out from music to do painting, he returned to the scene and played with, Benny Carter, Jamal and others.

2000s
In 2005, he had his album The Jazz Composer's Songbook released on Straight Ahead Records and produced by Stewart Levine and mastered by Bernie Grundman.

Around the mid-2000s onwards, his group The John Heard Trio played at Charlie O's club in Van Nuys. In 2005, the group consisted of John Heard on bass, Tom Garvin on piano and Roy McCurdy on drums. At the club they played with Justo Almario and Rickey Woodard. Around 2010, the group consisted of Heard on bass, Andy Langham on piano and Roy McCurdy on drums and later around 2011, Lorca Hart instead of McCurdy was on drums. They would play Fridays and Saturdays there. Some of the musicians they would appear with were trumpet player Scotty Barnhart, trumpet player Ron King, saxophonists Chuck Manning, Don Menza, Lanny Morgan and guitarist Thom Rotella.Healdsburg Jazz Festival 7 April 2011 "Healdsburg All Stars at the Raven – June 11"

Discography
LPs
 Heard Ranier Ferguson – Heard Ranier Ferguson – ITI Records – JL 003 – 1983
 John Heard & Co. – The Jazz Composer's Songbook – Straight Ahead Records – SAR102 (180gram) 2005

CDs
 John Heard & Co. – The Jazz Composer's Song Book – Straight Ahead Records – SAR102 (Hybrid, Dual Disc, Side1: CD, Side2: DVD) 2005
 Evan Hartzell Trio - Songs About Love and Nature feat. John Heard and Laura Alvarez -LJD002(lejazzdiscos) 2009

Appearances (selective)
 The George Duke Trio – Jean-Luc Ponty Experience with the George Duke Trio – 1969
 George Duke - The Inner Source - 1971
 Moacir Santos – Maestro – 1972
 Cal Tjader – Live at the Funky Quarters - 1972
 Cal Tjader – Puttin' It Together - 1973
 Cal Tjader and Charlie Byrd – Tambu - 1973
 Cal Tjader – Last Bolero in Berkeley - 1973
 George Duke - Faces in Reflection - 1974
 George Duke - Feel - 1974
 Moacir Santos – Saudade - 1974
 Count Basie and Zoot Sims – Basie & Zoot – 1975
 Joe Henderson – Canyon Lady – 1975
 Ahmad Jamal – Recorded Live at Oil Can Harry's – 1976
 Count Basie – Basie Jam 2 – 1976
 Jean-Luc Ponty – Cantaloupe Island – 1976
 Count Basie  – Basie Jam 3 – 1976
 Lew Tabackin and Warne Marsh - Tenor Gladness - 1976
 Harry Edison – Edison's Lights (Pablo, 1976)
 Blue Mitchell – Stablemates – 1977
 Count Basie – Kansas City 5 – 1977
 Oscar Peterson and Count Basie – Satch and Josh...Again – 1977
 Kenny Burrell – Stormy Monday – 1978
 Oscar Peterson – The London Concert – 1978
 Oscar Peterson and Count Basie – Yessir, That's My Baby – 1978
 Ira Sullivan - Peace (Galaxy, 1978)
 Ira Sullivan - Multimedia (Galaxy, 1978 [1982])
 Toshiko Akiyoshi – Toshiko Plays Billy Strayhorn – 1978
 Ella Fitzgerald – Dream Dancing – 1978
 Oscar Peterson and Count Basie – Count Basie Meets Oscar Peterson – The Timekeepers – 1978
 John Haley Sims and Harry Sweets Edison – Just Friends – 1978
 B.B. King – Let the Good Times Roll – 1979 
 Ahmad Jamal – Intervals – 1980
 George Cables – Morning Song (HighNote, 1980 [released 2008])
 Kenny Burrell – Moon and Sand – 1980
 Tete Montoliu - Catalonian Nights Vol. 1, Catalonian Nights Vol. 2, Catalonian Nights Vol. 3 - 1980
 Oscar Peterson and Count Basie – Night Rider – 1980
 Count Basie – Kansas City 7 – 1980
 Gene Harris – Live at Otter Crest – 1981
 Eddie "Cleanhead" Vinson – I Want a Little Girl (Pablo, 1981)
 Gene Harris – Hot Lips – 1982
 Count Basie – Mostly Blues...and Some Others – 1983
 Pharoah Sanders – Heart is a Melody – 1983
 Tete Montoliu - Carmina - 1984
 George Cables – Phantom of the City – 1985
 Bobby Hutcherson - Color Schemes - 1985
 Buddy Montgomery – Ties of Love – 1986
 George Cables – By George – 1987
 Bud Shank – That Old Feeling (Contemporary, 1986)
 Bud Shank – Serious Swingers (Contemporary, 1987) with Bill Perkins
 Frank Morgan Bud Shank Quintet – Quiet Fire (Contemporary, 1987 [1991])
 Toshiko Akiyoshi – Lew Tabackin Big Band – Sumi-e – 1993
 Hugh Masekela – Almost Like Being in Jazz'' – 2005

References

1938 births
2021 deaths
21st-century American sculptors
21st-century American male artists
American jazz musicians
American male sculptors
Musicians from Pittsburgh